Barry Coley (born 20 December 1946) is a New Zealand cricketer. He played in three first-class matches for Wellington in 1971/72.

See also
 List of Wellington representative cricketers

References

External links
 

1946 births
Living people
New Zealand cricketers
Wellington cricketers
Cricketers from Wellington City